The fourth season of Canadian Idol began in February 2006 ran until September 2006. Zack Werner, Jake Gold, Sass Jordan, and Farley Flex returned to judge, and Ben Mulroney returned to host, with Elena Juatco as the new roving reporter. The season premiered on May 29, five days after the finale of American Idol Season 5. The Canadian Idol title was awarded to competitor Eva Avila on September 17, 2006.

On Saturday, September 16, 2006, a day prior to the public announcement of the Idol results, Sony BMG Music Entertainment began offering Avila's version of the first single, Meant to Fly, for sale on the website |EvaAvila.com. Although the page was subsequently blanked, the artwork for the single could be located within the image files of the webpage. This occurrence led to the creation of many rumours regarding the winner of the competition.

Auditions
Auditions were held in eleven cities in the Winter and early Spring of 2006 in the following order:
 February 18 & 19: Edmonton
 February 23: Yellowknife (advance city)
 February 25 & 26: Vancouver
 March 4 & 5: Regina
 March 11 & 12: Winnipeg
 March 17 & 18: Montreal
 March 25 & 26: Ottawa
 April 8 & 9: Halifax
 April 18: St. John's
 April 22 & 23: Kitchener, Ontario
 April 28 & 30: Toronto

Notable auditioners
Chelsea Johnson: It was her 4th audition for the show; she is notable for farting just as she was about to sing, and then gasping "I totally just farted!", which sent the judges into a laughter frenzy. This infamous moment later aired on Most Outrageous Moments, and is very popular on YouTube.

Top 22, the semi-finals
For the fourth season, the format of the preliminary rounds was changed, based on American Idols Top 24. The wildcard round was abolished; instead, the Top 22 was divided into a group of 11 men and another group of 11 women. Two competitors were eliminated from each group for three weeks, resulting in a 5 male and 5 female Top 10 for the finals.

The Toronto elimination rounds were aired in a two-hour broadcast on June 20. One original member of the Top 22, Philip King, dropped out for unspecified personal reasons and was replaced by Chris Labelle.

Those who were eliminated before the finals are listed below.

Males eliminatedSheldon Elter, 27, is from Edmonton, Alberta and an accomplished local theatrical writer and actor. His one-man play, Metis Mutt, which was performed at the Edmonton Fringe Festival in 2002, won him two local awards. He is the first aboriginal competitor in the program's history.Keith Macpherson, 27, is from Winnipeg, Manitoba but auditioned in Toronto. An English major at the University of Winnipeg, he sings in the local pop group Easily Amused.Chris Labelle, 24, is a bar server from Ottawa, Ontario. He was originally cut from the Top 22, but was named to the semi-finals after Phil King quit.Greg Neufeld, 22, is from Abbotsford, British Columbia and auditioned in Vancouver. He is a member of the band Di Marco. Greg auditioned again for Canadian Idol Season 5 and made the Top 10.Jeremy Kozielec (or simply Koz), 26, is from Winnipeg, Manitoba and the lead singer of independent band Floor 13. He made the top 50 for Rock Star: INXS in 2005.Nathan Brown, 26, is from Dewberry, Alberta, and auditioned in Edmonton. He is a former cruise ship singer and has built his own personal recording studio in his home.

Females eliminatedAshley Coles, 16, is from Caledonia, Ontario, who auditioned in Kitchener. She is a Grade 11 student at McKinnon Park Secondary School.Nancy Silverman, 19, is from Thornhill, Ontario and auditioned in Kitchener. She is a student of musical theatre at Sheridan College.Alisha Nauth, 19, is from Kitchener, Ontario, and a student at Humber College. She has performed at several local events and competitions in her career.Alyssa Klazek, 17, is from Calgary, Alberta and auditioned in Edmonton. She is a Grade 11 student at Bishop Carroll High School.Anna-Belle Oliva, 20, is from Montreal, Quebec and a recent graduate of a musical school. Her audition video centered around the recent death of her brother. When she was 16 years old, she was in the TV series Mixmania in Quebec, in a group called Aucun Regret.Valérie Jalbert, 21, a music teacher from Saint-Jérôme, Quebec who auditioned in Montreal, Quebec, is the first competitor in Canadian Idol history to reach the semi-finals in two different seasons. She was eliminated in the first voting round in Season 2.

Top 22
Men

Women

Top 18
Men

Women

Top 14
Women

Men

Top 10, the finals
After the Semi-Finals, the final 10 competitors are faced with a new theme challenge every week. Based on public voting, one finalist is eliminated each week. The season finale of Canadian Idol took place on September 17, 2006. It was moved from its usual Tuesday result show to Sunday to help CTV premiere their new fall TV shows like The Amazing Race. Eva Avila from Gatineau, Quebec is 2006 Canadian Idol.

FinalistsEva Avila (born February 25, 1987 in Gatineau, Quebec, 19 years old during the season), is a postal clerk from Hull, Quebec, who auditioned in Ottawa. She was a former winner of the Jeune Diva du Quebec contest. She is the 2006 Canadian Idol.Craig Sharpe (born September 23, 1989 in Carbonear, Newfoundland and Labrador, 16 years old during the season), is from Upper Island Cove, Newfoundland, and auditioned in St. John's. He is a Grade 11 student at Ascension Collegiate School.Tyler Lewis (born July 3, 1986, 20 years old during the season), is a waiter from Rockglen, Saskatchewan, and auditioned in Regina.Chad Doucette (born August 3, 1988, 18 years old during the season), is from East Chezzetcook, Nova Scotia, and auditioned in Halifax. He made the Top 48 in Season 3, but was cut in the last round before the semi-finals. In Season 4, he became known for a "wardrobe malfunction" in the early rounds in which his shirt got stuck in the zipper of his pants during the middle of a song.Steffi DiDomenicantonio (known as Steffi D) (born April 28, 1989 in Orleans, Ontario, 17 years old during the season), is from Ottawa, Ontario. A student at Ecole secondaire De La Salle, she has been a stage performer at several Ottawa-area venues. She is known for the trademark bow in her hair.Ashley Coulter (born April 26, 1983 in Emeryville, Ontario, 23 years old during the season), is a supermarket cashier from London, Ontario, who auditioned in Kitchener. She was a singer in a local rock band called Nemesis.Rob James (born October 30, 1977, 28 years old during the season), is from Winnipeg, Manitoba. He was a former member of the pop group McMaster & James who auditioned for Season 4 after his group's album deal expired. He has also written a song for the debut CD of Season 1 winner Ryan Malcolm.Brandon Jones (born June 17, 1989 in St John's, Newfoundland, 17 years old during the season), is from Quispamsis, New Brunswick and auditioned in his birthplace of St John's, Newfoundland. He is a Grade 11 student at Kennebecasis Valley High School.Sarah Loverock (born June 11, 1981, 25 years old during the season), is a supermarket supervisor from Gibsons, British Columbia, who auditioned in Vancouver and has performed in Nashville. She made it to the Top 48 in 2005's Season 3 before being cut. Sarah released a single entitled The Dreamer with America's Hot Musician winners that was certified Gold by the CRIA on November 4, 2009.Kati Durst (born December 12, 1979, 26 years old during the season), is an automotive detailer from Goderich, Ontario, who auditioned in Kitchener. Despite having a severe cold when auditioning, she was still put through to the next round.

Finals
Top 10 – Canada Rocks!

Top 9 – The Rolling Stones

Top 8 – The 80s

Top 7 – Classic Rock

Top 6 – Unplugged

Top 5 – Country

Top 4 – Judge's Choice

Top 3 – Standards

Finale
Each contestant sang three songs.

The Judges' Comments
Listed below is a selection of criticisms and praises from the Judges Jake Gold, Sass Jordan, Farley Flex and Zack Werner from the Top 5 Performance show to the season finale. The songs the idols sang during the performance show can be seen on the list above.

Top 2 Performance ShowEva Avila (Winner) Sass Jordan: "You are an international artist and you are the jewel in the Canadian Idol crown" (1-Wild Horses)
 Jake Gold: "I'd love to hear the recorded version of that song. It was wonderful" (2-Meant to Fly)
 Zack Werner: "You're a songwriter's dream." (2-Meant to Fly)
 Farley Flex: "Your performance was my favourite performance on Idol, but not just of you, of anybody" (3-How come you don't call me)
 Zack Werner: "Clive Davis should come here and kiss your Canadian ***" (3-How come you don't call me)
 Sass Jordan, Farley Flex, Jake Gold: [STANDING OVATION](3-How come you don't call me)Craig Sharpe (Runner Up) Jake Gold: "That was, without a doubt, the best thing you've done on this show" (1-Meant to Fly)
 Farley Flex: "To step up at this point in time shows you're a man to be respected" (1-Meant to Fly)
 Zack Werner: (Hugged Craig) (1-Meant to Fly)
 Zack Werner: "You're the Freddie Mercury of Canada" (2-I Surrender)
 Sass Jordan: "The first time I saw you in Newfoundland I knew you were a star and my opinion hasn't changed a bit" (3-What hurts the most)

Top 3 Performance ShowTyler Lewis: (Eliminated) Farley Flex: "You just got the most votes for one singular body movement" (1)
 Zack Werner: "It wasn't very much on the singing part but I think you may just have won Canada's next top model" (1)
 Sass Jordan: "Tyler...it had to be you!" (2)
 Farley Flex:: "You really took it by the horns" (2)Eva Avila Sass Jordan: "You just did something that people can only do when they're born with it" (1)
 Zack Werner: "No disrespect to Kalan, but he's no Eva Avila" (1)
 Zack Werner: "Dude, I don't rap, you shouldn't scat," (2)Craig Sharpe: Jake Gold: "I just didn't feel like you got into the song." (1)
 Zack Werner: "Kickstart this thing, man. Be a star, dude" (1)
 Jake Gold: "At the end you brought it right home." (2)
 Sass Jordan: "That was an unbelievably lovely performance" (2)

Top 4 Performance ShowCraig Sharpe: Zack Werner: "The fact is that song totally fits your pipes and your vibe and if you won this thing and released it, it would go number one" (1)
 Farley Flex: "It was really easy to choose songs for you" (2)Tyler Lewis: Zack Werner: "I was all ready to go 'he shoots, he scores,' but you came out really flat in the third period" (1)
 Zack Werner: "You scared some children under their beds." (2)Chad Doucette: (Eliminated) Jake Gold: "You delivered it. You did exactly what we thought you would do with that song." (1)
 Farley Flex: "The most memorable voice on the show" (1)
 Sass Jordan: "I've got to say I was hurting a bit at the beginning, but you totally redeemed yourself with that moment at the end" (2)Eva Avila: Farley Flex: "You gave us a vision of who you will be." (1)
 Jake Gold: "I thought vocally it was really good, but... it's an angry song, but you were smiling" (1)
 Zack Werner: "I say Canadian Idol: Eva Avila." (2)

Top 5 Performance ShowEva Avila:  Jake Gold: "I always wondered how you were going to do country and you took that song and made it Eva. You made it work"
 Sass Jordan: "You're just getting better and better"Craig Sharpe: Farley Flex: "I think the biggest thing in that performance was the maturity you showed,"
 Zack Werner: "I felt it, but you have such a unique instrument, I want you to be as big and obnoxious as me. Or Jake."Steffi D.: (Eliminated) Zack Werner: "It's very cornball... But I think people have to decide, as much as I love you, if you're the next Canadian Idol."Tyler Lewis: Farley Flex: "I'm no Farley Pride but your kinfolk should be proud."Chad Doucette:'''
 Zack Werner: "But to be honest, I didn't even remember I was here. I was just watching that, remembering how much I care for you from the beginning."

Song Themes
Each week, a song theme will be presented to the competitors. Each competitor must base their song choice on the theme of the week.
 July 17 - Canada Rocks! - Songs written & recorded by Canadian Artists.
 July 24 - The Rolling Stones
 July 31 - Music of The 1980s
 August 7 - Classic rock
 August 14 - Unplugged (Acoustic music)
 August 21 - Country music
 August 28 - Judges' Choice September 4 - Pop standards

Performers on results shows
Each week, a guest performer will appear on the results show to perform one song. The guests will be listed here.
 July 18 - Nelly Furtado singing "Promiscuous"
 July 25 - (No Performer)''
 August 1 - Cyndi Lauper singing "Time After Time" and "Shine"
 August 8 - Dennis DeYoung & Roger Hodgson
 August 15 - Chantal Kreviazuk singing "In This Life" (accompanied by the Top 6) and "All I Can Do"
 August 22 - Martina McBride singing "I Can't Stop Loving You" (accompanied by the Top 5) and "Till I Can Make It On My Own"
 August 29 - Rex Goudie singing "Run"
 September 5 - Tony Bennett
 Finale- Melissa O'Neil, Nelly Furtado singing "Maneater", Canadian Idol Top 10

Releases
By May 2007, only Eva Avila and Craig Sharpe had released solo albums. Brandon Jones signed a two-record deal with Sound Of Pop Records and his debut album was expected to be released in May, but wasn't released until June 19, 2007. Tyler Lewis released a solo album on June 20 called 'I'm Coming Home'. Semi-finalists Chris LaBelle and Nancy Silverman both released CDs as well, Chris' is called 'Two Weeks Tuesday' and Nancy's is called 'Now You Know My Secrets'. Eva Avila's second album, 'Give Me the Music' was released on October 28, 2008.

Elimination Chart

External links
 Official Website

4
2006 Canadian television seasons
2006 in Canadian music